Peter Perfect may refer to:
 Peter Perfect in the Turbo Terrific, a character in the cartoon Wacky Races
 Peter Brock, Australian motor racer
 Peter Gregg (racing driver), U.S. motor racer
 Peter Ishkhans, judge on the makeover reality series Tease

See also